Descours is a French surname. Notable people with the surname include: 

 Cyril Descours (born 1983), French actor
 Jean-Pierre Pranlas-Descours (born 1956), French architect

French-language surnames